Volleyball at the 1984 Summer Paralympics in Stoke Mandeville and New York consisted of standing and sitting volleyball events for men.

Medal summary

Medal table

References 

 

1984 Summer Paralympics events
1984
Paralympics